The Moscow School of Management SKOLKOVO is a graduate business school located near Skolkovo, Moscow Oblast, close to Moscow, Russia. The school, founded in 2006, is a joint project between major Russian and international business leaders.

SKOLKOVO Business School is funded solely by its commercial activities and private investment.

One of the first SKOLKOVO International Advisory Board members was Lee Kuan Yew, the Minister Mentor of the Republic of Singapore.

History
The groundbreaking ceremony was held on September 21, 2006 in the presence of Russian President Vladimir Putin, founding partners, and architect David Adjaye. Corporate education programs launched the same year.

The first meeting of the SKOLKOVO International Advisory Board passed in 2007. The meeting was chaired by Dmitry Medvedev and attended among others by Lee Kuan Yew, the Minister Mentor of the Republic of Singapore. That same year, SKOLKOVO Business School participated in the World Economic Forum in Davos as an organizer of the Discussion Platform on the Development of Intellectual Capital.

SKOLKOVO MBA and SKOLKOVO Executive MBA programs were launched in 2009.

In 2010 SKOLKOVO Business School became a member of EFMD and UNICON.

The SKOLKOVO Education Development Center was launched in 2011.

The SKOLKOVO Startup Academy and the New Leaders of University Education programme were added in 2012.

The Practicum for Directors, a programme for the managers of small and mid-sized businesses was launched in 2013. The SKOLKOVO Wealth Management and Philanthropy Center opened that same year.

The First Annual Alumni Convention was held in 2014. The SKOLKOVO MBA programme ranked first in Russia by The Secret of The Firm magazine.

The SKOLKOVO Sustainable Business Center for expertise in sustainable development was launched in 2015. Experts of the Business School participated in the Unknown Russia: Powered by Entrepreneurs report for the World Economic Forum in Davos.

In 2016, SKOLKOVO signed a three-year cooperation agreement with the School of Business and Management of Hong Kong University of Science and Technology (HKUST) for the collaborative development of educational programs, academic quality processes, and research collaboration and faculty/student exchanges. The SKOLKOVO MBA grant programme, the largest among Russian private schools was launched. The launch of SKOLKOVO Healthcare Development Centre followed the same year. The open enrollment programme on Sustainable Strategies for business executives was conducted for the first time.

2017: EFMD Excellence in Practice Finalist in the special category “Ecosystem Development”. EFMD Case Writing Competition Winner in the Sustainable Production System Category.

2018: EFMD Excellence in Practice Gold Award in Special Category “Ecosystem Development”. Launch of HKUST-SKOLKOVO EMBA for Eurasia, LIFT (Leadership Identity Foundation and Transformation) jointly with IMD, MPS (Master of Public Strategy), Leaders as Teachers and Executive couching programmes.

Campus

The concept and design of the campus were conceived by well-known British architect David Adjaye as a reflection on the ideas of the great artist Kazimir Malevich.

The architectural project of the Skolkovo campus was presented in the Russian pavilion at the 11th Venice biennale

Skolkovo campus represents a disk with four different-sized buildings located on its roof. The main building, also known as The Disk, features seven clusters named after the continents and BRIC countries. The Campus has 16 classrooms and 49 rooms for project and group work. Buildings on the roof are a dormitory, a hotel, an administrative building, and a sports centre. \

Degree programmes
SKOLKOVO Business School offers two intakes of MBA programmes per year, one intake of Executive MBA, starting each spring and one EMBA for Eurasia – joint dual degree programme with HKUST Business School (Hong Kong). Both the MBA and EMBA programmes are part-time (4 days a month), including 2 international (Silicon Valley and China and Hong Kong) modules.

The MBA programme is designed so that all the fundamental core courses are learnt in the first half of the programme (first 7-8 modules). The second half of the programme focuses more on applicability of all the skills and knowledge in project work. The school annually holds a grants competition for MBA and half of the cohort consists of students who received scholarships.

The final module of the SKOLKOVO MBA is conducted under the extreme conditions of the Kamchatka Peninsula. The objective of this location is to give participants an opportunity to explore leadership qualities and teamwork skills in conditions of uncertainty.

The EMBA programme includes core fundamental business courses with the focus on strategic overview of business concepts, two international modules and concludes with the Integration Module, which includes a two-day integrative simulation. 

The EMBA for Eurasia is international business education for top managers and business owners developing their business in Eurasia, is 16-months dual-degree programme developed jointly by HKUST Business School (one of the most prestigious business schools in Asia) and SKOLKOVO. The programme focuses on business in Eurasia within the framework of the Belt and Road Initiative. The programme has modules in 7 countries: Russia (SKOLKOVO Business School), China (HKUST), Kazakhstan (Nazarbaev University), Armenia, Israel (Tel-Aviv University), Switzerland (University of St.Gallen) and USA (University of California, Berkeley).

Entrepreneurial programmes 
SKOLKOVO helps SME teams and individual entrepreneurs to develop their management and business competencies as well as launch a real business project in Russia or abroad. The Startup Academy is aimed at entrepreneurs who are planning to open their own business, for entrepreneurs who want to scale up their business and for investors who want to learn how to invest successfully. During the programme students make business model and financial model for their business, learn how to make marketing and sales efficiently, how to make invest pitch. 

SKOLKOVO Practicum is a five-module open course for entrepreneurs and managers/general directors of small- and medium-sized Russian businesses. SKOLKOVO Practicum takes a systematic approach to the development and consolidation of management skills among small- and medium-sized business leaders. The programme trains business owners and managers to change their current situation and take their business to the next stage of development.

In 2018 SKOLKOVO has launched a new programme Practicum Global Shift focusing on SMEs that are targeting expansion into international markets.

Executive education 
Executive Education programs focuses on companies’ transformation and top-management teams’ education and development. To date, the School has delivered more than 350 programmes for more than 150 corporate clients, including Russia's largest corporations and industrial “blue-chips”, such as Lukoil, Rosatom, TNK BP, EVRAZ, and Gazprom.

SKOLKOVO provides programs for the educational sector (management of Russian universities), regional governments, single-enterprise cities, etc. In 2017, the Institute for Public Strategy was launched to target expansion of the School's offering for the public sector – including management programs for such areas as healthcare, non-profit organizations, etc.

In 2016 the SKOLKOVO-Rosatom educational programme won the EFMD Excellence in Practice Silver Award, resulting in a [business case | https://www.efmd.org/images/stories/efmd/EIP/2016/Rosatom-Skolkovo_Moscow_School_Managment-Exec-summary-EiP2016.pdf].

In 2019 Moscow School of Management SKOLKOVO is launching an international training programme for municipal officials to retrain public administration teams of Russia's 100 largest cities. Training will be conducted by lecturers of the Moscow School of Management SKOLKOVO as well as international business schools including IMD, INSEAD, IESE and HKUST.

Research 
Skolkovo's research agenda focuses on global practices resulting in applied knowledge which has relevance and impact in the field. SKOLKOVO has 8 centres of expertise conducting research in different areas:

 SKOLKOVO Institute for Emerging Market Studies
 SKOLKOVO Executive Coaching, Career and Development Centre
 SKOLKOVO Energy Centre
  SKOLKOVO Education Development Centre
 SKOLKOVO Wealth Transformation Centre
 SKOLKOVO Healthcare Development Centre
 SKOLKOVO Centre for Digital Transformation
 SKOLKOVO Financial Innovations and Cashless Economy Centre
 SKOLKOVO Consumer market development center

People
The Skolkovo Founders are 20 Russian and international individuals and businesses. The founding individuals include Alexander Abramov, Roman Abramovich, and Ruben Vardanian in a practical partnership that extends beyond financial contribution to build on the cumulative 200 years of management experience. The businesses include companies like Credit Suisse, GUM Trade Center, Severstal, TNK-BP, and Troika Dialog.

Teaching method 
Most programmes are based on “learning by doing” principle and include simulations, practical tasks, project work.

Notable alumni
Key figures of SKOLKOVO Alumni community

 74% men
 26% women

See also 
 National Technological Initiative
 EFMD Quality Improvement System (EQUIS)
 Association to Advance Collegiate Schools of Business (AACSB)
 European Foundation for Management Development (EFMD)

References

Education in Moscow
Business schools in Russia
Educational institutions established in 2006
David Adjaye buildings
2006 establishments in Russia
Skolkovo, Moscow Oblast